The Champion Winter Beer of Britain is an award presented by the Campaign for Real Ale (CAMRA) at its annual Great British Beer Festival Winter. The award is similar to the Champion Beer of Britain which is presented at the Great British Beer Festival.

Qualification and judging
As for Champion Beer of Britain, beers can qualify in three ways:

 CAMRA tasting panels judge the beers in their geographic area of the UK.  The recommendations of these panels are put forward to 6 regional panels, with the winners of these qualifying for the finals in August.
 Votes from CAMRA members via a form in What's Brewing, the CAMRA newsletter.
 Winning one of the 150 Beer of the Festival awards from CAMRA beer festivals held throughout the year

Nominated beers are then grouped into categories and go through several rounds of blind tasting at the Great British Beer Festival Winter. Category winners are then re-judged to determine the supreme champion — the Champion Winter Beer of Britain.

Categories
Beers are split into categories depending on their style or strength.

 Old Ales & Strong Milds
 Barley Wines
 Porters
 Stouts

Results
There were two National Winter Ales Festivals in 1997. The first one at the beginning of the year presented the 1996/7 awards and the other, at the end of the year, presented the 1997/8 awards. There was no festival in 1998, the next one being in January 1999.

Key
 Blue background indicates beers that were named Supreme Champion after winning in their category.
 Green background indicates beers that were named Supreme Winter Beer but not Supreme Champion.

Supreme Winter Beer of Britain category

Old Ale category
 1991: Old Ales & Strong Milds
 1994–1995: Old Ales & Strong Ales
 1996 onwards: Old Ales & Strong Milds

Barley Wines category

Barley Wines category

Barley Wine & Strong Old Ales category

Stout & Porter category

Porter category

Stout category

References

 

Beer in the United Kingdom
British awards
Beer awards